FIA European Formula 3 Championship was a former European Formula Three racing competition, organised by the FIA.

The series started in 1966 as a one-race event for national teams, named the Formula 3 Nations European Cup. In 1975, with the introduction of a new regulation for 2000 cc cars, the series was expanded into a proper championship. It was cancelled in 1984, and it was replaced by the European Formula Three Cup the next year, returning to a one-event format.

In 1987, the EFDA started a new pan-European championship, named F3 Euroseries, but it ran for a single season. A proper continental series, re-using the Formula 3 Euro Series name, started in 2003, from the merger of the German and French championships.

Champions

Table with all the F3 Drivers that competed in the FIA European Formula 3 Championship (1975–1984):

(It does not include entries when the driver was entered in a race, but he did not appear at the event).

See also
Formula Three
FIA Formula 3 European Championship
Formula 3 Euro Series
FIA European Formula Three Cup

External links
FIA European Formula 3 Championship at forix.com

Fédération Internationale de l'Automobile
Recurring sporting events established in 1975
Recurring sporting events disestablished in 1984
1975 establishments in Europe
1984 disestablishments in Europe
Formula Three series